"Hard On Me" is a song by Australian rock duo Divinyls. It was released in 1996 as the fourth single from their fifth studio album Underworld. The single was not as commercially successful as earlier single, only peaking at number ninety-four on the Australian singles chart.

Track listing
Australian CD Single
 "Hard On Me" (Edit)
 "Hard On Me" (Danger Mix)
 "Hard On Me" (Instrumental)

Charts

References

1996 singles
Divinyls songs
Songs written by Chrissy Amphlett
Songs written by Mark McEntee
1996 songs
Ariola Records singles